The Independent Democrats (ID) was a South African political party, formed by former Pan Africanist Congress member Patricia de Lille in 2003 via floor crossing legislation. The party's platform was premised on opposition to corruption, with a mixture of liberal principles and strategies for improving equity. The party's strongholds were the Northern and Western Cape.

On 15 August 2010, the party announced plans to merge with the larger Democratic Alliance as part of a plan to challenge the governing African National Congress (ANC). The party disbanded as a separate political organization in 2014.

2009 election manifesto 
Ahead of the national elections in 2009, the ID launched a manifesto promising that, if elected to power, they would increase the staffing of the South African Police Service to 200,000, enlist 5,000 caseworkers to operate in crime-stricken communities, make South Africa a leader in renewable energy and finance a minimum social grant by taxing luxury goods, tobacco and alcohol. In addition they vowed that an "ID government would fire a minister whose department received a qualified audit two years in a row."

Merger with DA 
In 2010, then-ID leader Patricia de Lille formalized an agreement to merge with the Democratic Alliance. The two parties merged by 2014. Due to this, the ID did not contest the 2011 local elections as a separate entity, instead fielding its candidates on the DA's ballots. In February 2012, the-then Leader of the Official Opposition, Lindiwe Mazibuko, reshuffled her shadow cabinet, which included appointing members of the ID to shadow portfolios for the first time. This was seen as a move towards strengthening the co-operation between the two parties heading towards the completion of the merger.

Election results

National elections

Municipal elections

See also 

Liberalism in South Africa

References 

General
 Hartley, Aziz. "ID releases election manifesto." Cape Times, 2 February 2009 in literature: 4.

External links 

Independent Democrats (official site)

Democratic Alliance (South Africa)
Liberal parties in South Africa
Defunct liberal political parties
Defunct political parties in South Africa
Political parties established in 2003
Political parties disestablished in 2014
Political parties in South Africa created by floor crossing
2003 establishments in South Africa
2014 disestablishments in South Africa